Nicabau Lake is a freshwater body of the unorganized territory of Lac-Ashuapmushuan, Quebec, in the western part of Regional County Municipality (MRC) Le Domaine-du-Roy, in the Saguenay-Lac-Saint-Jean administrative region, in the province of Quebec, in Canada.

This lake is located mainly in the canton of Ducharme, except the bay of the South which is located in the canton of Bouterque. This lake is marked the western boundary of the Ashuapmushuan Wildlife Reserve.

Forestry is the main economic activity of the sector. Recreational tourism activities come second.

The forest road route 167 passes on the east side of Nicabau Lake, connecting Chibougamau to Saint-Félicien, Quebec. The Canadian National Railway runs along route 167. The Nicabau railway stop served the area.

The surface of Nicabau Lake is usually frozen from early November to mid-May, however, safe ice movement is generally from mid-November to mid-April.

Geography

Toponymy
Of Innu origin, the toponymic spelling of this body of water has varied often since the days of New France, including: Nekouba, Nekoubau, Nicoupao, Necoubeau, Nikaubau or Nikabau. Nikabau would mean "lake surrounded by hay".

In the past, the lake was a crossroad for travelers on major waterways (particularly the Normandin River, particularly those leading from Tadoussac or Trois-Rivières to Trois-Rivières. Hudson Bay]] In 1661, the Jesuit fathers Dablon and Druillettes reached the place they identify as Nekouba, describing it as a famous place because of a fair that is held there In the years when all the native people from the area go shopping, a 1661 map showing the missionaries' trip mentions the name of Nekouba, and the names "Nekoubou River" and "Nek8pas Lake" are indicated on 1672 maps respectively. 1680. Guillaume Delisle indicates on his map of 1703: "Necouba (post office)" and "R. de Necoub" The Jesuit Laure will use the gentile "Nekubauists" on his "Map of the Domaine du Roy in Canada" of 1732.

The toponym "lac Nicabau" was formalized on December 5, 1968, by the Commission de toponymie du Québec.

Notes and references

See also 

Lakes of Saguenay–Lac-Saint-Jean
Le Domaine-du-Roy Regional County Municipality